Tom Keough (born 10 October 1991) is an Australian rules football player. He is captain of the West Adelaide Football Club in 2018.

Keough grew up in the Murray Mallee and played junior football for the Pinnaroo Supa Roos in the Mallee Football League. He was recruited to the West Adelaide Football Club in the South Australian National Football League (SANFL) and played in its 2015 premiership side. In the 2016 AFL rookie draft he was selected by the Gold Coast Suns. He returned to West Adelaide after the 2016 season.

Keough won the Fos Williams Medal as the best South Australian player in their Inter-State match in 2015 against Western Australia.

References

External links

Living people
1991 births
Australian rules footballers from South Australia
West Adelaide Football Club players